The 53rd Space Operations Squadron (53 SOPS) is a United States Space Force unit. Assigned to the Space Operations Command's Space Delta 8, it is responsible for providing payload and transmission command and control of the Wideband Global SATCOM and Defense Satellite Communications System constellations. It is headquartered at Schriever Space Force Base, Colorado.

History 

The Squadron's namesake comes from the Army's 53rd Signal Battalion, currently assigned the U.S. Army Space and Missile Defense Command's U.S. Army Satellite Operations Brigade. In September 2021, it was announced that the Battalion's operational mission and personnel would be transferred to the United States Space Force. Activated on 29 June 2022 at a ceremony held at Peterson Space Force Base, the Squadron became the newest unit within the United States Space Force. The unit is distinct in its mission, being the sole armed forces entity to control payload functionality for all U.S. Wideband MILSATCOM.

Emblem symbolism 
The 53d Space Operations Squadron's emblem consists of the following elements:
 Platinum represents the men and women of Space Operations Command.
 Atlas and the Globe symbolize the unwavering strength and support 53d Space Operations Squadron Guardians provide globally to warfighters, interdepartmental, and multinational partners.
 The spacecraft and orbit signify Guardians' mastery of payloads and transmission control through generations of communications platforms.
 The constellation Pleiades pays homage to the organization's past as a United States Army unit and the seven stars represent previous command structure and operational elements at each Wideband Satellite Operations Center. Ancient stories depict the Pleiades as a group of loved ones who left their way of life to ascend to the heavens, and the 53d Space Operations Squadron embodies these stories in its transfer to the United States Space Force.

Structure 
Headquarters, Schriever Space Force Base, Colorado
 Detachment A, Fort Detrick, Maryland
 Detachment B, Fort Meade, Maryland
 Detachment C, Landstuhl, Germany - Activated 19 July 2022
 Detachment D, Wahiawa, Hawaii - Changed from Camp Roberts, California to Wahiawa, Hawaii in 2011 
 Detachment E, Fort Buckner, Japan

List of Commanders 
 Lt Col D. Susan Rogers, 29 June 2022

List of Superintendents 
 SMSgt Raymond T. Flores, 29 June 2022

See also 
 Space Delta 8
 10th Space Operations Squadron
 U.S. Army Satellite Operations Brigade

References

External links
 

Military education and training in the United States